WWDX (1530 AM, "Sport 1530") is a daytime-only radio station broadcasting a sports format. Licensed to Huntingdon, Tennessee, United States, the station is currently owned by Jim W Freeland and features programming from SportsMap.

References

External links

WDX
Carroll County, Tennessee
Sports radio stations in the United States
WDX